Gelotia is a genus of jumping spiders that was first described by Tamerlan Thorell in 1890.

Species
It contains ten species, found only in Asia and on New Britain:
Gelotia argenteolimbata (Simon, 1900) – Singapore
Gelotia bimaculata Thorell, 1890 – Borneo
Gelotia bouchardi (Simon, 1903) – Indonesia (Sumatra)
Gelotia frenata Thorell, 1890 (type) – Indonesia (Sumatra)
Gelotia lanka Wijesinghe, 1991 – Sri Lanka
Gelotia liuae (Wang & Li, 2020) – China
Gelotia robusta Wanless, 1984 – Papua New Guinea (New Britain)
Gelotia salax (Thorell, 1877) – Indonesia (Sulawesi)
Gelotia syringopalpis Wanless, 1984 – China, Malaysia, Borneo
Gelotia zhengi Cao & Li, 2016 – China

References

External links
Description and drawings
Photographs of Gelotia sp

Further reading
 

Salticidae genera
Salticidae
Spiders of Asia
Taxa named by Tamerlan Thorell